Ballylumford Dolmen is situated on Islandmagee, County Antrim, Northern Ireland, near the north-west tip of the Islandmagee peninsula and near Ballylumford power station. It is known locally as the "Druid's Altar", and could be 4000 years old, or the remains of an even earlier passage grave. The dolmen consists of four upright stones, with a heavy capstone and a fallenstone within the structure. This may have been put there to block the entrance to the tomb. The dolmen is in the front garden of a house. A wall plaque at the site describes the dolmen as a single chambered grave erected about 2000-1600 BC.  Local finds indicate occupation of the neighbourhood during the Bronze Age.

Ballylumford Dolmen is a portal tomb and a State Care Historic Monument in the townland of Ballylumford, in Larne Borough Council area at grid ref: D4304 0160.

See also
List of archaeological sites in County Antrim

References

Archaeological sites in County Antrim
Dolmens in Northern Ireland